Jimmy Orlando Quiroz Plaza (born 27 May 1983) is a Chilean footballer.

His last club was San Antonio Unido.

References
 

1983 births
Living people
Chilean footballers
Deportes Copiapó footballers
San Marcos de Arica footballers
Unión San Felipe footballers
Magallanes footballers
San Antonio Unido footballers
Chilean Primera División players
Primera B de Chile players
Association football forwards